Long Ashton was a rural district in Somerset, England, from 1894 to 1974.

It was created in 1894 under the Local Government Act 1894.

In 1974 it was abolished under the Local Government Act 1972 to become part of North Somerset.

The parishes which were part of the district included Abbots Leigh, Backwell, Blagdon, Brockley, Clapton in Gordano, Cleeve, Dundry, Easton in Gordano, Flax Bourton, Kenn, Kingston Seymour, Long Ashton, Nailsea, Portbury, Portishead and North Weston, Winford, Wraxall and Failand, and Yatton.

References

Long Ashton Rural District at Britain Through Time
Local Government Act 1972

Districts of England created by the Local Government Act 1894
Districts of England abolished by the Local Government Act 1972
History of Somerset
Local government in Somerset
Rural districts of England